Maddie & Tae is the eponymous debut EP from American country music duo Maddie & Tae.  Written by Madison Marlow and Taylor Dye, the work was recorded at Blackbird Studio, and was released on November 4, 2014 and is the first work produced by Dot Records.

Track listing

Chart performance
The album has sold 12,600 copies in the US as of March 2015.

References

2014 EPs
Maddie & Tae EPs
Dot Records albums
Albums produced by Dann Huff